Gregorius Thiels, O Praem., was the 43rd abbot of Averbode Abbey, the last before the French Revolution.

Thiels entered Averbode abbey in 1762. He studied theology at Louvain University. In 1774 after his ordination he received the name Gregorius. He was elected abbot in 1770, and by permission of the Emperor sat in the States of Brabant as a member for the First Estate. Four years later the monks were chased out of their abbey. In 1808 the abbot returned. He died there in 1822.

His portrait painted by Andreas Bernardus de Quertenmont is kept inside Averbode Abbey.

References

Abbots of the Austrian Netherlands
Members of the States of Brabant
1742 births
1822 deaths